Interstate 495 (I-495) is an auxiliary route of I-95 in the US state of Massachusetts, maintained by the Massachusetts Department of Transportation (MassDOT). Spanning , it is the second-longest auxiliary route in the Interstate Highway System, being roughly  shorter than I-476 in Pennsylvania.

Serving as one of two beltways (the other being Route 128) that forms a semicircle around Boston, and being the "outer" beltway, I-495 has its northern terminus in Salisbury, where it splits from I-95. Its route forms an arc with an approximately  radius around the city and intersects seven additional radial expressways: I-93, US Route 3 (US 3), Route 2, I-290, I-90 (Massachusetts Turnpike), Route 24, and I-95 once more. I-495 has its southern terminus in Wareham, at the meeting of I-195 and Route 25. Originally, the stretch from Route 24 to I-195 was signed as Route 25, that status now only begins east of I-195.

I-495 and areas to its immediate east are often regarded as the inner ring of Greater Boston. West of I-495 is the Worcester area and Central Massachusetts. I-495 is a heavily traveled route serving communities in Plymouth, Bristol, Norfolk, Worcester, Essex, and Middlesex counties.

Route description

I-495 begins as the direct continuation of Route 25 at the intersection with I-195 in West Wareham. It starts as a two-lane highway in both directions. It gets the third lane during the interchange with Route 24. The junction includes the unusual transition of shrinking from the six-lane Route 25 to the four-lane interstate due to the third lane of Route 25 joining to and from I-195. The road heads roughly northwest, passing through the towns of Rochester and Middleborough (where the road meets US 44) as a four-lane highway before entering Bristol County, crossing the Taunton River at Raynham. I-495 becomes a six-lane highway just southeast of the Route 24 interchange (which is actually in neighboring Bridgewater).

The road continues northwest through Taunton and Norton before entering Mansfield, where there is a short collector–distributor road concurrency with Route 140. I-495 makes its southern junction with its parent route, I-95, on the border between Mansfield in Bristol County and Foxborough in Norfolk County. The road continues through Plainville (where there is a junction with US 1. The highway comes within  of the Rhode Island state line before turning in a more northerly direction through Franklin and Bellingham.

I-495 passes through Milford, Medway, Hopkinton (where the junction with the Massachusetts Turnpike, or I-90, is located), and Westborough (where the road meets Route 9). It then continues through Southborough, Marlborough (where the road meets US 20 and I-290), Hudson, Berlin, Bolton (where the road finally begins to turn northeasterly), and Harvard.

Continuing to turn to a more easterly direction, the road passes through Boxborough, Littleton (where there is an intersection with Route 2), Westford and Chelmsford. At the Chelmsford–Lowell line lies the intersection with US 3 and the Lowell Connector (formerly I-495 Business). The road continues through Lowell and Tewksbury before entering Essex County at Andover, directly at exit 94 (formerly exit 39).

In Andover, the road has a junction with I-93. It then enters the city of Lawrence, where the road turns due north, crossing the Shawsheen River into North Andover before crossing the Merrimack River at the O'Reilly Bridge back into Lawrence. It then heads into Methuen, where the road turns back to a northeasterly route after the junction with Route 213 (Loop Connector). The road heads into Haverhill, crossing the Merrimack twice more at a bend in the Bradford section of town. It passes north of downtown Haverhill, coming within  of the New Hampshire state line, the closest the road comes to leaving the state.

Throughout its path, the road passes closely to several existing state highways. From Wareham through to the Middleborough Rotary, it parallels Route 28. For much of the stretch between Norton and Milford, the road is within a few miles of Route 140, with two junctions of that highway in Mansfield and Franklin. From Milford to Bolton, the road passes just west of Route 85. Much of the northern third of the route also roughly parallels Route 110.

History
As early as the late 1940s, a plan was developing for an "outer circumferential highway" around Boston, a limited-access freeway meant to have an approximate  radius from the Boston city center. A portion of this new "outer circumferential highway" southeast of the US 1 junction in Foxborough was meant to be a "relocation" of the existing Route 28, which was quickly changed in 1947 to a new designation of Route 25 as a full-length freeway from the Route 24 expressway in Raynham to Wareham. The section of I-495 between Route 24 in Raynham and I-95 at the Foxborough–Mansfield town line began construction at I-95 in 1976 and finished at the Route 25/Route 24 interchange in 1982. (Prior to 1982, I-495 ended at I-95; the section from Raynham to Wareham was just signed as Route 25). Route 25 was constructed in stages from the late 1950s to the late 1960s.

Future
In 2014, a new intelligent transportation system system was installed to help commuters and the state better understand the traffic congestion on I-495. Some improvements expected to come to I-495 in the next few years include a project that will install fiber-optic cable, traffic cameras, and variable-message signs on I-495 from I-90 (Hopkinton) to I-93 (Andover).

In 2015, the state pledged $165 million to 285 million (equivalent to $ to $ in ) for improvements to the I-495/Massachusetts Turnpike intersection and is considering three different plans. The work is expected to begin in 2021 and be completed in 2025. Improvements to the I-495/Route 9 intersection will commence at the same duration, with a different budget.

Exit list

Interchanges were to be renumbered to mileage-based numbers under a project scheduled to start in 2016; however, this project was indefinitely postponed by MassDOT until November 18, 2019, when MassDOT confirmed that, beginning in late summer 2020, the exit renumbering project would start. On May 7, 2021, MassDOT announced that I-495 exit numbers would get renumbered starting on or after May 16, 2021, and it would last for approximately five weeks. The project was broken down into four sections:
 Segment 1: between Route 28 and I-95 (old exits 3–13)
 Segment 2: between I-95 and I-90 (old exits 14–22)
 Segment 3: between I-90 and US 3 (old exits 23–35)
 Segment 4: between US 3 and junction Route 110/I-95 (old exits 37–55)

References

External links

95-4 Massachusetts
495 Massachusetts
4 Massachusetts
95-4
Transportation in Bristol County, Massachusetts
Transportation in Essex County, Massachusetts
Transportation in Middlesex County, Massachusetts
Transportation in Norfolk County, Massachusetts
Transportation in Plymouth County, Massachusetts
Transportation in Worcester County, Massachusetts